See Mercedes-Benz S-Class for a complete overview of all S-Class models.

The Mercedes-Benz W111 was a chassis code given to a range of Mercedes-Benz vehicles produced between 1959 and 1971, including four-door saloons (1959-1968) and two-door coupés and cabriolets (1961 to 1971). Their bodywork featured distinctive tailfins that gave the models their Heckflosse nickname — German for "fintail".

Introduced with a 2.2-litre inline 6-cylinder engine, the W111 spawned a pair of variant lines which bracketed it in 1961: downscale entry-level inline 4-cylinder engined vehicles sharing the W111 chassis and bodies, designated the W110; and the W112, a high-end luxury saloon built on the W111 chassis with its body but exclusive features, elaborate appointments, and the Mercedes-Benz 300d Adenauer's fuel-injected 3-litre M189 six-cylinder engine – at the time the company's largest.

Somewhat confusingly, both the W111 and W112 lines included vehicles with different Paul Bracq-designed bodywork, the 2-door coupé and cabriolet.

Design
Mercedes-Benz emerged from World War II as an automaker in the early 1950s with the expensive 300 Adenauers and exclusive 300 S grand tourers that gained it fame, but it was the simple unibody Pontons which comprised the bulk of the company's revenues.

Work on replacing the Pontons began in 1956 with a design focused on passenger comfort and safety. The basic Ponton cabin was widened and squared off, with a large glass greenhouse improving driver visibility. A milestone in car design were front and rear crumple zones for absorbing kinetic energy on impact. The automaker also patented retractable seatbelts.

Production history

Saloon

Series production of the 4-door saloon began in August 1959, which made its debut at the Frankfurt Auto Show in the autumn. Initially the series consisted of the 220b, 220Sb, and 220SEb. These replaced the (W105) 219, the (W180) 220S and the (W128) 220SE Ponton saloons respectively. The 220b was an entry-level version with little chrome trim, simple hubcaps, and basic interior trim that lacked pockets in the doors. Prices were DM16,750, 18,500 and 20,500, with a rough sales ratio of 1:2:1.

All models shared the 2195 cc M127 straight-six engine carried over from the previous generation, producing  at 4800 rpm and capable of accelerating the heavy car to 160 km/h (155 if fitted with optional automatic gearbox).

In 1961, the W111 chassis and body were shared with the even more basic 4-cylinder W110 and a luxury W112 version built on the W111 chassis with its body and the Type 300 series' 3-litre M189 big block 6-cylinder engine, many standard power features, and a high level of interior and exterior trim. The body of the W110 featured a shorter bonnet, compared to the W111.

In May 1965, the 220Sb and 220SEb were replaced by the new 230S. It was visually identical to the 220S, with a modernised 2306 cm3 M180 engine with twin Zenith carburettors producing  at 5400 rpm. As a successor to the 220b, Mercedes-Benz also introduced the 230, with the 2306 cm3 engine fitted into the W110 series car. A total of 41,107 230S models were built through January 1968, when the last of 4-door fintails left the production line.

During its ten-year run between 1959 and 1968 a total of 337,803 W111s were built.

Coupé and cabriolet 

Design of a replacement for the two-door Pontons began in 1957. Since most of the chassis and drivetrain were to be unified with the saloon, the scope was focused on the exterior styling. Mercedes chose the work of engineer Paul Bracq, which featured a more square, subtle rear-end treatment, more evocative of the later squarish styling of the subsequent W108/W109 than the sharp-edged tailfins of the saloon.

Production began in late 1960, with the coupé making its debut at the 75th anniversary of the opening of Mercedes-Benz Museum in Stuttgart in February of the next year. The convertible followed at the Frankfurt Auto Show a few months later.  Almost identical to the coupé, its soft-top roof folded into a recess behind the rear seat and was covered by a tightly fitting leather "boot" in the same color as the seats. Unlike the previous generation of two-door ponton series, the 220SE designation was used for both the coupé and convertible; both received the same version of the 2195 cc M127 engine. Prices in 1962 were 32,500 for the coupé and 36,000 Dutch Guilders for the cabriolet. Options included a sliding sunroof for the coupé, automatic transmission, power steering, and individual rear seats.

In March 1962, Mercedes-Benz released the exclusive two-door M189-powered 300SE. Like the 300 saloon, it was based on the W111 chassis but shared both Daimler's top-range 2996 cm3 fuel-injected engine and the unique W112 chassis designation, efforts on Mercedes' part to distance it from the maker's modest W110 and W111 lineups and link it to the prestigious W188 300S two-door luxury sports tourer. It was distinguished by a chrome strip, and featured air suspension and a higher level of interior trim and finish. Prices were 45,000 and 48,500 for the hard and soft roofs respectively.

In summer of 1965 Mercedes-Benz launched replacements for both W111 and W112 saloons, the W108 and W109 respectively. With the tailfin fashion well eroded by the mid 1960s, the new design was based on the restrained W111 coupé, widened and squared off. Work on a future new chassis that would fully replace the Ponton-derived W111/W112 and W108/W109 was well under way. With a concept car of the first S-Class was shown in 1967, Daimler declined to develop a two-door W108/W109 vehicle, instead continuing production of the aging W111/W112 with modest changes.  The 220SE was superseded in early autumn 1965 by the 250SE, which featured the new 2496 cm3 M129 engine. Producing  at 5500 rpm, it gave the vehicle a significant improvement in top speed,  ( with automatic transmission), and 0–100 km/h (62 mph) acceleration time of 12 seconds (14 with automatic transmission). Visible changes include new 14-inch wheels, which came with new hub cabs and beauty rings accommodating the larger disc brakes and new rear axle from the W108 family.

In November 1967 the 250 SE was superseded by the 280 SE. It was powered by the new 2778 cc M130 engine, which produced  at 5500 rpm. Top speed was hardly affected, but acceleration from 0-100 km/h (62 mph) improved to 10.5 seconds (13 with automatic transmission). Inside, the car received a wood veneer option on the dashboard and other minor changes, including door lock buttons and different heater levers. The hubcaps were changed yet again to a new one piece wheelcover, and the exterior mirror was changed.

Despite its smaller engine, the 280 SE could outperform the early 1950s M189 powered 300 SE, resulting in the more expensive model's retirement.

The 280 SE 3.5

A final model was added in August 1969, the 280 SE 3.5, the first Mercedes post-War coupé with more than 3 litres. The car was fitted with the brand-new M116 3499 cc V8. As one of several changes to modernize the aging design a lower, wider grille was incorporated and the facelifted model is often by the Germans referred to as the "flachkühler". The new grill was not a side-effect of enlarging the engine compartment to accommodate the V8 despite popular belief. Front and rear bumpers were also modified with the addition of rubber rub strips; the rear lenses changed to a flatter cleaner design. This change was carried across to the standard 280 SE. As the top of its range, the 280 SE 3.5 is seen as an ideological successor to the W112 300 SE, though it lacked the W112's air suspension.

There were plans to place the larger M117 V8 engine in the W111 (the model would have been called 280 SE 4.5).

The last 280 SE was produced in January 1971, with the 280 SE 3.5 ending in July. The total production over the decade was: 220 SEb - 16,902, 250 SE - 6,213, 280 SE - 5,187, and 280 SE 3.5 - 4,502 units. Not including 3,127 W112 300 SE models, the grand total of 2-door W111 models was 32,804 of which 7,456 were convertibles.

The indirect replacement for the coupé was the C107 SLC, which was a hardtop coupé version of the SL roadster, with no link with the S Class range. The true successor of the W111/12 coupé was the C126 (SEC) coupé of 1981. As the R107 SL grew bigger and more luxury oriented, it assumed the position of the top of the range convertible, which meant the four-seater convertible would disappear from Mercedes-Benz's lineup for nearly two-decades, until  the A124 in 1992.

Models

Model timeline

References

Notes

Bibliography

General

 
 
 
 
 
 
 
 
  (also covers the W111)

Workshop manuals

External links

Curbside Classic: 1966 Mercedes 250SE Cabriolet (W111) – The Classiest Mercedes Of Them All? – a retrospective of the W111 cabriolet

W111
W111
Executive cars
1960s cars
1970s cars
Cars introduced in 1959
Limousines